Holston Army Ammunition Plant (HSAAP) manufactures Research Department Explosive (RDX) and High Melting Explosive (HMX) for ammunition production and development. It is government-owned and contractor-operated (GOCO) facility that is part of the US Army Joint Munitions Command.

History
The Holston Army Ammunition Plant, also known as the Holston Ordnance Works, was constructed by Tennessee Eastman in Kingsport, Tennessee to manufacture explosives during World War II.

BAE Systems' division Ordnance Systems, Inc. currently operates the plant under a 25-year facilities use contract.  On May 12, 2011, the Army announced that BAE Systems had won the contract to operate Radford Army Ammunition Plant in nearby Radford, VA as well.

Capabilities 
Capabilities of the plant include:  production and development of insensitive munitions explosives; synthesis and manufacture of high explosives; recrystallization and purification from organic solvents; melt-cast, cast-cured, pressed and extruded explosives formulation; explosives performance testing; full-spectrum explosives research and development capability; and custom and fine chemical manufacture for the defense industry. Information Provided by the Joint Munitions Command

Current operations 
The two plants are connected by rail. Plant A has . Plant B has . The site as a whole includes 465 buildings.

History 
Holston Ordnance Works [HOW] was established in July 1942 and stopped production in 1945. It was reactivated in 1949 during the Cold War and continues today. The installation was renamed Holston Army Ammunition Plant [HSAAP or HAAP] in the early 1960s. Holston Defense Corporation operated the facility from 1949 through 1999 under a series of cost reimbursement contracts with the U. S. Army.

The plant was constructed 1942–1944 for use by the government contractor, Tennessee Eastman Corporation, a subsidiary of Eastman Kodak.  During World War II, it manufactured Composition B, a very powerful explosive mixture of RDX and TNT.  The facility was placed in standby status after World War II, producing only fertilizer, until it was reactivated in 1949 under the Holston Defense Corporation, a new subsidiary of Eastman Kodak.

During the Korean War, the plant continued to manufacture Composition B as well as rework its stockpiled Composition B.  New production lines were built during 1951–1954 in order to produce for the war. However, after the Korean War it was reduced to a one-line operation.  It did not resume large-scale production until the mid-1960s when it was again modernized to produce large amounts of Composition B for the Vietnam War.

After 1973, production was again reduced to a much smaller amount, but the plant also began producing "special-order" explosives and propellants for the Armed Services, including the Navy's Trident missile program. It also handles and stores material for the national defense stockpile.

As of 1988, the plant produced all of the RDX/HMX consumed in the United States, and 90 percent of that used by all of the nations friendly to the USA.

Facilities 
.Information Provided by the Joint Munitions Command

References

External links 
Joint Munitions Command website
Information compiled from 
Historic American Engineering Record (HAER) documentation, filed under Kingsport, Sullivan County, TN:

Buildings and structures in Hawkins County, Tennessee
Historic American Engineering Record in Tennessee
Military installations in Tennessee
United States Army arsenals